Schuttertal is a municipality in  Baden-Württemberg, Germany and belongs to the district of Ortenau. It is located in the Schutter Valley in Black Forest.

Schuttertal was founded from the three towns Schuttertal, Dörlinbach and Schweighausen in the district reform of 1974.

References

External links
 Schuttertal's Official Website

Ortenaukreis